is a 1998 Japanese film directed by Itsumichi Isomura.

Cast 
Rena Tanaka - Etsuko Shinomura
Mami Shimizu - Atsuko Nakazaki
Wakana Aoi - Rie Yano
Kirina Mano - Taeko Kikuchi
Emu Hisazumi - Mayumi Nakaura
Tomoko Nakajima - Akiko Irie
Ryoko Moriyama - Satoko Shinomura
Hakury - Kensaku Shinomura
Ren Osugi - Principal of Iyo Higashi High School

Awards and nominations
20th Yokohama Film Festival 
 Won: Best Director - Itsumichi Isomura
 Won: Best Cinematography - Yuichi Nagata
 Won: Best Supporting Actor - Ren Osugi
 Won: Best Newcomer - Rena Tanaka
2nd Best Film

See also
Ganbatte Ikimasshoi

References

External links

1998 films
Films directed by Itsumichi Isomura
1990s Japanese-language films
1990s Japanese films

ja:がんばっていきまっしょい#映画